Adolphus Busch was the founder of Anheuser Busch.

Adolphus Busch may also refer to:
Adolphus Busch III, grandson of the founder
Adolphus Busch Hall, a Harvard University building

See also
Adolf Busch, German-born violinist and composer
Adolphus Buschbeck, American army commander

Busch, Adolphus